Theodore J. St. Antoine (born 1929) is an American lawyer and legal scholar. He has served on the faculty of the University of Michigan Law School since 1965 and is currently the James E. and Sarah A. Degan Professor Emeritus of Law at the school. St. Antoine served as dean of the Law School from 1971 to 1978.

St. Antoine graduated from Fordham College and the University of Michigan Law School. He also spent a year at the University of London as a Fulbright Scholar. He began practicing law in Cleveland and served a tour in the Army JAG Corps before practicing in labor law in Washington, D.C.

St. Antoine is known for his writing in the field of labor relations and labor law. He is active in labor arbitration of union and management disputes, acting as arbitrator in dozens of Major League Baseball arbitration matters, the parties of which have included the league and individual teams, agents, and players, including Curt Schilling, Sandy Alomar Jr., and Darryl Strawberry. St. Antoine served as President of the National Academy of Arbitrators in 1999–2000.  St. Antoine was the official draftsperson for the Model Employment Termination Act (META).  He also authored a defense of that act, The Model Employment Termination Act: A Fair Compromise published in the Annals of the American Academy of Political and Social Science in 1994.

St. Antoine has taught as a visiting faculty member at Cambridge, Duke, George Washington, and Tokyo University, and in Salzburg.  In the past few years he has spent a great deal of time teaching labor relations and arbitration in Chinese universities, and speaking about developing labor law in China.

He edited the first and second editions of The Common Law of the Workplace: The Views of Arbitrators. He serves on the internal board of review of the United Automobile Workers, a UAW-constitutional agency that provides redress for aggrieved union members.

Bibliography

References

Fordham University alumni
University of Michigan Law School alumni
American legal scholars
Deans of law schools in the United States
1929 births
Living people
Deans of University of Michigan Law School
United States Army officers